Woonsocket, is a city in Providence County, Rhode Island, United States. The population was 43,240 at the 2020 census, making it the sixth largest city in the state. Being Rhode Island's northernmost city, Woonsocket lies directly south of the Massachusetts state line and constitutes part of both the Providence metropolitan area and the larger Greater Boston Combined Statistical Area.

The city is the corporate headquarters of CVS Health, a pharmacy services provider. It is home to Landmark Medical Center, the Museum of Work and Culture, and the American-French Genealogical Society.

History

Before the arrival of European settlers in northern Rhode Island during the 17th century, today's Woonsocket region was inhabited by three Native American tribes: the Nipmuc (Cowesett), Wampanoag, and Narragansett. In 1661, the English theologian Roger Williams purchased the area from the "Coweset and Nipmucks", and in a letter referred to modern day Woonsocket as Niswosakit.

Other possible derivations of the name include several Nipmuc geographic names from nearby Massachusetts. These include Woonksechocksett, from Worcester County meaning "fox country", and Wannashowatuckqut, also from Worcester County, meaning "at the fork of the river". Another theory proposes that the city was named after Woonsocket Hill in neighboring North Smithfield.

Woonsocket Falls Village was founded in the 1820s. Its fortunes expanded as the Industrial Revolution developed in nearby Pawtucket. With the Blackstone River providing ample water power, the region became a prime location for textile mills. In 1831 Edward Harris built his first textile mill in Woonsocket.

The town of Woonsocket was not established until 1867, when three villages in the town of Cumberland, namely Woonsocket Falls, Social and Jenckesville, officially became the town of Woonsocket. In 1871, three additional industrial villages from Smithfield– Hamlet, Bernon, and Globe, were added to the town, establishing its present boundaries. Woonsocket was incorporated as city in 1888.

The growth of industries and associated jobs attracted numerous immigrants, predominantly Québecois and French-Canadians from other provinces. When the Société Saint-Jean-Baptiste d'Holyoke organized a national cultural and benefit society in 1899, the Union Saint-Jean-Baptiste d’Amérique, Woonsocket, with its proximity to several industrial areas having large French-Canadian populations, was chosen for the organization's headquarters.

By 1913, a survey by the American Association of Foreign Language Newspapers found the city had to have the 6th-largest population of French or French-Canadian foreign nationals in the country. In the decades that followed this population grew, and by time the local textile industry shuttered during the Great Depression, ethnic French Canadians comprised 75 percent of the population. French-language newspapers were published; radio programs, movies, and most public conversations were conducted in French. As recently as 1980, 70% of Woonsocket's population was of French-Canadian descent. The New England French language their ancestors spoke gradually vanished from public discourse.

Throughout the 20th century the city's fortunes ebbed and flowed with national trends. During the Great Depression the textile economy of Woonsocket came to an effective standstill; however, it was revived during World War II. The city became a major center of fabric manufacturing for the war effort, including production of military uniforms.

In the postwar years, the Woonsocket economy diversified as manufacturing declined, and other commercial sectors, such as retail, technology and financial services took hold. In the early 1980s Woonsocket was struggling with high unemployment rates.

Beginning in 1979, Woonsocket sponsored Autumnfest, an annual cultural festival that takes place on Columbus Day weekend, at World War II Veteran's Memorial State Park. It has become one of the city's most popular events, attracting thousands of attendees.

Geography 
Woonsocket is drained by the Blackstone River. Adjacent communities include Blackstone and Bellingham, Massachusetts, along with Cumberland and North Smithfield, Rhode Island.

Climate
Woonsocket has a strong humid continental climate (Köppen Dfa) with four distinct seasons. Being influenced by both the sea and the interior during winter, diurnal temperature variation is relatively high, with days most often being above freezing before severe frosts hit at night.

Demographics

At the 2010 census Woonsocket had a population of 41,186. The population was 71.3% non-Hispanic white, 14.2% Hispanic or Latino, 6.4% African American, 5.4% Asian, 0.4% Native American and 4.3% reporting two or more races.

At the 2000 census, there were 43,224 people, 17,750 households, and 10,774 families residing in the city. The racial makeup of the city was 83.14% White, 4.44% African American, 0.32% Native American, 4.06% Asian, 0.03% Pacific Islander, 4.86% from other races, and 3.14% from two or more races. Hispanic or Latino of any race were 9.32% of the population.

Woonsocket is a part of the Providence metropolitan area, which has an estimated population of 1,622,520.

There were 17,750 households, out of which 31.2% had children under the age of 18 living with them, 39.4% were married couples living together, 16.2% had a female householder with no husband present, and 39.3% were non-families. Of all households, 32.7% were made up of individuals, and 12.5% had someone living alone who was 65 years of age or older. The average household size was 2.37 and the average family size was 3.02.

In the city, the population was spread out, with 25.8% under the age of 18, 9.2% from 18 to 24, 30.0% from 25 to 44, 19.7% from 45 to 64, and 15.2% who were 65 years of age or older. The median age was 35 years. For every 100 females, there were 91.2 males. For every 100 females age 18 and over, there were 86.8 males.

The median income for a household in the city was $30,819, and the median income for a family was $38,353. Males had a median income of $31,465 versus $24,638 for females. The per capita income for the city was $16,223. About 16.7% of families and 19.4% of the population were below the poverty line, including 31.3% of those under age 18 and 14.7% of those age 65 or over. In March 2013, The Washington Post reported that one-third of Woonsocket's population used food stamps, putting local merchants on a "boom or bust" cycle each month when EBT payments were deposited.

At the 2000 census, 46.1% of Woonsocket's population were identified as being of French or French-Canadian ethnic heritage.

Arts and culture

Historic sites

Properties and districts in Woonsocket listed on National Register of Historic Places:

 1761 Milestone
 Allen Street Historic District
 Alphonse Gaulin Jr. House (1885)
 Bernon Worsted Mill (1919)
 Cato Hill Historic District
 Frank Wilbur House (1923)
 Glenark Mills (1865)
 Grove Street Elementary School (1876)
 Hanora Mills (1827)
 Harris Warehouse (1855)
 Henry Darling House (1865)
 Honan's Block and 112-114 Main Street (1879)
 Hope Street School (1899)
 Island Place Historic District
 Jenckes Mansion (1828)
 John Arnold House (1712)
 L'Eglise du Precieux Sang (1873)
 Linton Block (1888)
 Logee House (1729)
 Main Street Historic District
 North End Historic District
 Philmont Worsted Company Mill (1919)
 Pothier House (1881)
 Smith-Ballou House (1906)
 Smithfield Friends Meeting House, Parsonage and Cemetery (1719/1881)
 South Main Street Historic District
 St. Andrews Episcopal Chapel (1894)
 St. Ann's Church Complex (1913)
 St. Charles Borromeo Church Complex (1867)
 Stadium Building (1925)
 Union Village Historic District
 Woonsocket City Hall (1856)
 Woonsocket Civil War Monument (1868)
 Woonsocket Company Mill Complex
 Woonsocket Depot Square (1847)
 Woonsocket District Courthouse (1894)
 Woonsocket Rubber Company Mill (1857)

Notable people

 Greg Abate, musician
 Norm Abram, master carpenter, TV host/personality
 Jonathan Earle Arnold, politician
 Lisa Baldelli-Hunt, politician
 Rocco Baldelli, former baseball player and current manager of the Minnesota Twins
 Latimer Whipple Ballou, congressman
 Bryan Berard, hockey player
 Brian Boucher, hockey player
 Percy Daniels, populist politician
 Marcel Desaulniers, chef
 Eddie Dowling, actor, screenwriter and songwriter
 Allen Doyle, golfer
 Denise Duhamel, poet
 Susan Eisenberg, voice artist
 Eileen Farrell, opera soprano
 Marie Rose Ferron, stigmatist
 Ernest Fortin, theology professor
 Stuart Gitlow, physician
 Edward Harris, manufacturer, philanthropist, and abolitionist
 Gabby Hartnett, baseball player and manager
 Michelle Holzapfel, woodworking artist
 Ambrose Kennedy, congressman
 Clem Labine, baseball player
 Nap Lajoie (1874-1959), baseball player
 Neil Lanctot, historian and author
 Francis Leo Lawrence (1937–2013), college president
 William C. Lovering, congressman
 James McAndrews, congressman
 J. Howard McGrath, politician
 Dave McKenna, jazz pianist
 Susan Menard, politician
 Isabelle Ahearn O'Neill, Rhode Island's first woman legislator
 Edwin O'Connor, radio personality and novelist
 Aram J. Pothier, governor
 Duke Robillard, blues guitarist
 Christopher Robinson, congressman
 Mathieu Schneider, NHL hockey player
Andre Soukhamthath, mixed martial artist
 Bill Summers, umpire

Filming location
Woonsocket has served as a filming location for several movies, including Hachi: A Dog's Tale (2009) and The Purge: Election Year (2016).

See also 

 Woonsocket High School
Woonsocket station

References

External links

 

 
Cities in Providence County, Rhode Island
Cities in Rhode Island
French-American culture in Rhode Island
History of the textile industry
Providence metropolitan area